Paquisha Canton is a canton of Ecuador, located in the Zamora-Chinchipe Province.  Its capital is the town of Paquisha.

References

Cantons of Zamora-Chinchipe Province